The Tanzanian passport is issued to citizens of the United Republic of Tanzania for international travel. The Immigration Department is responsible for the issuance of Passports for the purpose of international travel. 

The Immigration Department falls under the Tanzanian Ministry of Home Affairs (In Kiswahili: Wizara ya Mambo ya Ndani ya Nchi). This passport is issued only to the citizens of Tanzania. There are three types of Passports, which are Ordinary, Service and Diplomatic. 

As of January 2018, Tanzania began issuing the new East African format ePassport, in line with the East African Community integration plans.

Features of the Tanzanian ePassport;
 –Electronic chip holding the same information as the old model passport
 –Enhanced Security features.
 –Biometric identifier
 –Digital photograph of the passport holder

The new ePassport is issued under different colors for Ordinary (navy blue), Diplomatic (red) and Service (green). The new ePassport has been made available to all Tanzanians seeking passports for international travel from January 2018. The old ordinary passport will be in use until January 2020 when it will be officially retired.

History
Before issuing the new ePassports,  the Passport Control Authority of Tanzania used to issue Machine-readable Passports. The previous model before the machine readable version, was designed in the 1970s, before computer technology became widely available, hence the holder's data was typewritten or even handwritten on it.  

In contrast to the current ePassports, the previous Ordinary Tanzanian passport was green in color, while the Diplomatic Passport was Black and Service Passport was blue.  The new Tanzanian ePassport complies with the ICAO standards. When the passport was first issued, the holder's fingerprints, signature and photograph would be digitally acquired and stored in a database, but only the holder's digital picture was coded in the physical passport, in a two-dimensional barcode. The latter, as well as the holder's personal identification data and his or her picture are directly laser-printed on the passport.

Validity
The Tanzanian passport is usually valid for a period of ten years from the date of issuance. Once expired it must be renewed in order to continue travelling. However, it can be renewed a few months before expiring so as not to inconvenience frequent travellers.

Languages
Details inside the passport are provided in Swahili (the national language) and English, which are the two de facto official languages. There are captions in the data page that are translated in these two languages as well.

Description
The new ePassports are navy blue color for ordinary citizens. They have the Tanzanian coat of arms emblazoned in gold in the centre of the front cover. The coat of arms reads, "Uhuru na Umoja", which means "Freedom and Unity". The words "East African Community" are inscribed at the top followed by "The United Republic of Tanzania"  inscribed in gold text above the coat of arms, while the words "Passport" is inscribed in gold text the coat of arms and "Pasipoti" inscribed in gold text at the bottom. 

The first page of the passport includes the passport note followed by the identity information page.  The pages inside the passport feature various designs including the 'big five game' animals  found in Tanzanian national parks and the unification of Tanzania and Zanzibar by former President Julius K. Nyerere.

The Data Page Includes:
1. Type
2. State code
3. Passport number
4. Surname
5. Name
6. Nationality
7. Date of birth
8. Sex
9. Issue date
10. Expiry date
11. Place of birth
12. Issuing authority
13. Electronically printed signature

Visa requirements

As of 13 November 2021, Tanzanian citizens had visa-free or visa on arrival access to 72 countries and territories, ranking the Tanzanian passport 77th (tied with Kenyan Passport) in terms of travel freedom according to the Henley visa restrictions index.

See also
Tanzanian nationality law
Visa requirements for Tanzanian citizens

References

Tanzania Ministry of Home Affairs, Passport Information.

External links
 Get more details on Tanzanian Travel Documents - Tanzanian Ministry of Home Affairs

Tanz
Government of Tanzania